American singer and rapper Swae Lee from the hip hop duo Rae Sremmurd has released one studio album, 24 singles (including 12 as a featured artist) and four music videos.

Studio albums

Singles

As lead artist

As featured artist

Promotional singles

Other charted songs

Guest appearances

Production discography

Production credits

TD up

Songwriting credits

Music videos

Notes

References

Discographies of American artists
Hip hop discographies